The 1904 Haskell Indians football team represented the Haskell Institute—now known as Haskell Indian Nations University— as an independent during the 1904 college football season. Led by Albert E. Herrnstein in his second and final season as head coach, the Indians compiled a record of 8–1.

Schedule

References

Haskell
Haskell Indian Nations Fighting Indians football seasons
Haskell Indians football